Johannes Ernest Everard "Jan" Keunen (born 2 October 1954) is a Dutch ophthalmologist, professor, and politician. After studying medicine at Radboud University Nijmegen and receiving his doctorate in 1988, he worked at academic hospitals in Utrecht, Leiden, and Nijmegen. He was appointed to the Senate in October 2020. Keunen is a member of the conservative–liberal People's Party for Freedom and Democracy (VVD) and has supported banning the sale of consumer fireworks.

Early life and education 
Keunen was born in 1954 in the Dutch city of Roermond to Rudy Keunen (1921–1996) and Béatrice Finály (1925). His father was the president of an Eindhoven leather tannery, which was founded by his great-grandfather in 1828, while his mother worked as a nurse. Keunen grew up with two sisters and one brother, and he attended the Eindhoven secondary school Scholengemeenschap Augustinianum from 1967 to 1972 at HBS-B level. He subsequently studied medicine at Radboud University Nijmegen, graduating in 1979, and served as a reservist at the Utrecht military hospital Dr. A. Mathijsen. Starting in 1981, Keunen was trained as an ophthalmologist at the Ooglijdersgasthuis in Utrecht. He became a junior staff member there in 1985, when he started studying at Utrecht University. He received his doctorate from that university three years later after finishing his dissertation titled Densitometry in diseases and senescence of the human retina.

Medical career 
Keunen stayed at the Ooglijdersgasthuis after completing his studies. He moved to the Academic Hospital Utrecht in 1989, when the Ooglijdersgasthuis became part of that hospital. In the years 1990–91, he visited the University of Chicago's Visual Sciences Center as a Fulbright Scholar.

Keunen took a job as ophthalmology department head and professor at the Leiden University Medical Center in 1995. His specialization was ocular oncology. In 2003, he also became chair of Vision 2020 Netherlands, an initiative of the World Health Organization to eliminate avoidable blindness and visual impairment. The initiative concluded that over 200,000 people in the Netherlands were unnecessarily suffering from these conditions. While working in Leiden, Keunen also served as scientific secretary and secretary of the professional organization Nederlands Oogheelkundig Gezelschap (NOG) starting in 1995 and as European co-chair of The International Agency for the Prevention of Blindness. He continued working at the Leiden hospital until February 2005.

Thereafter, Keunen served as teacher, professor, and head of the ophthalmology department at the Radboud University Medical Center. Keunen's research has focussed on laser surgery and new treatments for patients with eye cancer and retina disorders including macular degeneration. His department was the first in the Netherlands to use a microsecond laser in 2007 and the Pascal Photocoagulator in 2008. Keunen cut back his hours after his wife's death in 2014 and became acting department head. That same year, he was appointed to the Health Council of the Netherlands, which advises the parliament and the government and has over 100 members. Keunen retired from the Radboud UMC in 2019 with his farewell lecture being planned for June 2020. However, it was postponed by one year due to the COVID-19 pandemic. Keunen was made an Officer in the Order of Orange-Nassau after his lecture in Saint Stephen's Church in Nijmegen.

During his career, he has called for a ban on the sale of consumer fireworks around New Year's Eve, as accidents can cause major eye injuries. He has argued consumer fireworks should be replaced by organized displays. Besides, he has promoted the use of safety glasses while being close to fireworks. In 2014, he was one of the initiators of a manifesto against consumer fireworks, which has been signed by hundreds of thousands of individuals and organizations. Keunen has also warned against illegal laser pointers.

Politics 
Keunen has been a member of the VVD since about 1990 and a member of the party's health care network since the early 2000s. Besides, he was the chair of VVD Nijmegen starting in 2014 and became chair of the organization VVD Rijk van Nijmegen when the former chapter merged with a few others in 2016. He remained its chair until January 2019, and he is still a board member of VVD Rijk van Nijmegen. During the 2019 Dutch Senate election, Keunen was placed fourteenth on the VVD's party list. He was not elected, as his party received 12 seats. Keunen was installed as senator on 26 October 2020 after Roel Wever had vacated his seat to accept the position of mayor of Heerlen. Avine Fokkens-Kelder was higher on the list, but she declined the position. Keunen simultaneously left the Health Council.

Parliamentary committees 
 Committee for the Interior and High Council of State/General Affairs and Royal Family
 Committee for Immigration and Asylum/Justice and Home Affairs Council
 Committee for Kingdom Relations
 Committee for Health, Welfare and Sport

Personal life 
Keunen married divorce attorney Florence Lohuis (1961–2014) on 14 April 1989 in Montfoort. They have two children, Victor (1991) and Béatrice (1994). Keunen is a resident of Nijmegen.

Decorations 
 Order of Orange-Nassau
 Officer (4 June 2021)

Selected publications

References 

1954 births
21st-century Dutch politicians
Dutch ophthalmologists
Academic staff of Leiden University
Living people
Members of the Senate (Netherlands)
Officers of the Order of Orange-Nassau
People from Nijmegen
People's Party for Freedom and Democracy politicians
Radboud University Nijmegen alumni
Academic staff of Radboud University Nijmegen
Utrecht University alumni